Hill 'n Dale is a census-designated place (CDP) in Hernando County, Florida, United States.  The population was 1,934 at the 2010 census.

Geography
Hill 'n Dale is located in eastern Hernando County at  (28.523830, -82.293973), along U.S. Route 98. The older part of the community is north of the highway, but the CDP was expanded for the 2010 census to include a more lightly settled area south of the highway.

Demographics

As of the census of 2000, there were 1,436 people, 463 households, and 368 families residing in the CDP. The racial makeup of the CDP was 70.54% White, 24.79% African American, 0.14% Native American, 0.56% Asian, 2.16% from other races, and 1.81% from two or more races. Hispanic or Latino of any race were 7.59% of the population.

There were 463 households, out of which 47.3% had children under the age of 18 living with them, 49.5% were married couples living together, 23.1% had a female householder with no husband present, and 20.5% were non-families. 15.8% of all households were made up of individuals, and 6.7% had someone living alone who was 65 years of age or older.  The average household size was 3.10 and the average family size was 3.43.

In the CDP, the population was spread out, with 36.4% under the age of 18, 9.9% from 18 to 24, 26.8% from 25 to 44, 17.4% from 45 to 64, and 9.5% who were 65 years of age or older.  The median age was 28 years. For every 100 females, there were 86.7 males.  For every 100 females age 18 and over, there were 72.9 males.

The median income for a household in the CDP was $31,974, and the median income for a family was $30,214. Males had a median income of $26,349 versus $22,065 for females. The per capita income for the CDP was $10,029.  About 20.6% of families and 18.5% of the population were below the poverty line, including 23.1% of those under age 18 and 5.4% of those age 65 or over.

See also
Wildlife Lane

References

Census-designated places in Hernando County, Florida
Census-designated places in Florida